The 2004 Open Championship was a men's major golf championship and the 133rd Open Championship, held from 15 to 18 July at the Old Course of Royal Troon Golf Club in Troon, Scotland.

Todd Hamilton won his only major championship, defeating 2002 champion Ernie Els by a stroke in a four-hole playoff. Phil Mickelson finished third, followed by Lee Westwood in fourth. Hamilton was the sixth consecutive American to win at Royal Troon.

History of The Open Championship at Royal Troon
Royal Troon first hosted The Open Championship in 1923 and the 2004 Open was its eighth. Royal Troon's list of champions includes Arthur Havers (1923), 4-time Open winner Bobby Locke (1950), 7-time major winner Arnold Palmer (1962), Tom Weiskopf (1973), 5-time Open champion Tom Watson (1982), Mark Calcavecchia (1989), and Justin Leonard (1997).

Course
Old Course

Lengths of the course for previous Opens (since 1950):

 1997: , par 71
 1989: , par 72
 1982: , par 72

 1973: , par 72   
 1962: , par 72
 1950: , par 70 

Opens from 1962 through 1989 played the 11th hole as a par-5.

Field
1. Top 10 and ties from the 2003 Open Championship
Thomas Bjørn (3,4), Ben Curtis (2,3), Brian Davis (4), Gary Evans, Nick Faldo (2), Sergio García (3), Retief Goosen (3,4,9,13,17), Freddie Jacobson (3,4), Davis Love III (3,12,13,17), Hennie Otto, Kenny Perry (3,13,17), Phillip Price (4), Vijay Singh (3,10,13,17), Tiger Woods (2,3,9,10,11,13,17)

2. Past Open Champions aged 65 or under on 18 July 2004
Mark Calcavecchia, John Daly, Ernie Els (3,4,13,17), Paul Lawrie, Tom Lehman, Justin Leonard (3,13,17), Sandy Lyle, Greg Norman, Mark O'Meara, Nick Price (3,13,17), Tom Weiskopf
David Duval and Tom Watson (26) withdrew.
Ian Baker-Finch, Seve Ballesteros, Tony Jacklin, Johnny Miller, Jack Nicklaus, Bill Rogers, and Lee Trevino did not enter.

3. The first 50 players on the OWGR on 27 May 2004
Robert Allenby (17), Stephen Ames, Stuart Appleby (13,17), Chad Campbell (13), Paul Casey (4), K. J. Choi (17), Stewart Cink, Darren Clarke (4), Chris DiMarco (13,17), Brad Faxon (13), Steve Flesch, Jim Furyk (9,13,17), Jay Haas (13,17), Todd Hamilton (23), Pádraig Harrington (4), Charles Howell III (13,17), John Huston, Trevor Immelman (4), Miguel Ángel Jiménez, Zach Johnson, Jonathan Kaye (13), Jerry Kelly (17), Stephen Leaney (4,17), Peter Lonard (4,17,19), Shigeki Maruyama, Shaun Micheel (11), Phil Mickelson (10,17), Craig Parry, Ian Poulter (4), Chris Riley, Adam Scott (4,12,17), David Toms (11,13,17), Bob Tway (13,21), Scott Verplank (13), Mike Weir (10,13,17)
Fred Couples, Scott Hoch, and Kirk Triplett did not play.

4. Top 20 in the final 2003 European Tour Order of Merit
Michael Campbell, Alastair Forsyth, Ignacio Garrido (5), David Howell, Raphaël Jacquelin, Lee Westwood

5. The Volvo PGA Championship winners for 2002–04
Scott Drummond, Anders Hansen

6. First 3 players, not exempt, in the top 20 of the 2004 European Tour Order of Merit as of 27 May
Joakim Haeggman, Barry Lane, Graeme McDowell

7. First 2 European Tour members, not exempt, in a cumulative money list taken from all official European Tour events from the Deutsche Bank - SAP Open TPC of Europe up to and including the European Open and including the U.S. Open
Richard Green, Jean-François Remésy

8. The leading player, not exempt having applied (7) above, in each of the 2004 European Open and the 2004 Scottish Open
Thomas Levet, Peter O'Malley

9. The U.S. Open Champions for 2000–04

10. The Masters Champions for 2000–04

11. The PGA Champions for 1999–2003
Rich Beem

12. The Players Champions for 2002–04
Craig Perks

13. Top 20 in the final 2003 PGA Tour Official Money List

14. First 3 players, not exempt, in the top 20 of the 2004 PGA Tour Official Money List as of 27 May

15. First 2 PGA Tour members, not exempt, in a cumulative money list taken from the 2004 Players Championship and the five PGA Tour events leading up to and including the 2004 Western Open
Frank Lickliter, Rory Sabbatini

16. The leading player, not exempt having applied (15) above, in each of the 2004 Western Open and the 2004 John Deere Classic
Steve Lowery
Mark Hensby did not play.

17. Playing members of the 2003 Presidents Cup teams
Tim Clark
Fred Funk did not play.

18. Winner of the 2003 Asian PGA Tour Order of Merit
Arjun Atwal

19. Top 2 from the 2003 PGA Tour of Australasia Order of Merit
Andre Stolz did not play.

20. Winner of the 2003–04 Sunshine Tour Order of Merit
Darren Fichardt

21. The 2003 Canadian Open Champion

22. The 2003 Japan Open Champion
Keiichiro Fukabori

23. Top 3 from the 2003 Japan Golf Tour Order of Merit
Tetsuji Hiratsuka
Toshimitsu Izawa did not play.

24. The leading player, not exempt, in the 2004 Mizuno Open
Hiroaki Iijima did not play.

25. First 4, not exempt having applied (24) above, in a cumulative money list taken from all official Japan Golf Tour events from the 2004 Japan PGA Championship up to and including the 2004 Mizuno Open
Dinesh Chand, Hidemasa Hoshino, Hur Suk-ho, Takashi Kamiyama

26. The 2003 Senior British Open Champion

27. The 2004 Amateur Champion
Stuart Wilson (a)

28. The 2003 U.S. Amateur Champion
Nick Flanagan (a)

29. The 2003 European Amateur Champion
Brian McElhinney (a)

International Final Qualifying
Africa – James Kingston, Grant Muller, Louis Oosthuizen, Tjaart van der Walt
Australasia – Andrew Buckle, Matthew Hazelden, Brendan Jones, Adam Le Vesconte, Paul Sheehan
Asia – Scott Barr, Kim Felton, Jyoti Randhawa, Yoshinobu Tsukada
America – Aaron Baddeley, Cameron Beckman, Glen Day, Luke Donald, Bob Estes, Mathew Goggin, Mathias Grönberg, Tim Herron, Skip Kendall, Hunter Mahan, Spike McRoy, Rod Pampling, Carl Pettersson, Bo Van Pelt
Steve Elkington qualified but withdrew prior to the tournament.
Europe – Paul Broadhurst, Christian Cévaër, Nicolas Colsaerts, Gary Emerson, Klas Eriksson, Kenneth Ferrie, Mark Foster, Peter Hedblom, Maarten Lafeber, Euan Little, Paul McGinley, Colin Montgomerie, Mårten Olander, Eduardo Romero, Miles Tunnicliff, Simon Wakefield
Warren Bennett qualified but withdrew prior to the tournament.

Local Final Qualifying (Saturday 10 July and Sunday 11 July)
Glasgow (Gailes) – Paul Bradshaw, Simon Dyson, Anthony Millar, Andrew Willey
Irvine – Jonathan Cheetham, Martin Erlandsson, Andrew Oldcorn, Sven Strüver
Turnberry Kintyre – Lloyd Campbell (a), Steven Tiley (a), Paul Wesselingh, Sean Whiffin
Western Gailes – Lewis Atkinson, Daniel Sugrue, Ben Willman

Alternates
Jimmy Green – IFQ America – replaced Steve Elkington
Barry Hume – Western Gailes – replaced Mark Hensby
Ian Spencer – Irvine – replaced Toshimitsu Izawa
Neil Evans – Turnberry Kintyre – replaced Warren Bennett
Brett Taylor – Glasgow (Gailes) – replaced Andre Stolz
David Griffiths – Western Gailes – replaced David Duval

Round summaries

First round  
Thursday, 15 July 2004

Paul Casey and Thomas Levet both carded 66 (−5) and held a two stroke lead over a group of nine players. The group at 3-under included amateur Stuart Wilson and Vijay Singh. Defending champ Ben Curtis carded a 75 (+4). In total there were 39 rounds under par, 25 of those being in the 60s. Home favourite Colin Montgomerie started with a 2-under 69.

Second round 
Friday, 16 July 2004

Skip Kendall stormed into the lead with a 66 to reach the halfway stage at 135 (−7). Casey dropped down the leaderboard with a 77, while Levet shot a 70 to drop down into second. K. J. Choi continued his good start with a 69, keeping him in a tie for third place with Barry Lane. Todd Hamilton finished the round with a 67 to move up into a tie for fifth place.

Amateurs: Stuart Wilson (+1), Campbell (+5), Tiley (+5), Flanagan (+6), McElhinney (+10).

Third round 
Saturday, 17 July 2004

Hamilton surged up the leader with a second consecutive 67 to finish the day at 205 (−8). Ernie Els, the 2002 champion, moved up to second at 206 with a 68, while one shot behind lay the reigning Masters champion Phil Mickelson, Retief Goosen, and Thomas Levet at 207 (−6).

Final round  
Sunday, 18 July 2004

A see-saw final round led to a two-man playoff between Hamilton and Els. Then he holed a  birdie on the par-5 16th to keep his cushion. Els had to make birdies to keep up, and he came through with pure putts on the 16th and 17th. Then came the wild 72nd hole, with Hamilton holding a one shot lead. Hamilton pushed his iron off the tee and into the rough, then chopped it across the fairway next to a guard railing that restricted his swing. Els hit his approach to within the shadow of the flag, leaving a 12-foot birdie attempt. Els suddenly had a putt to win, but left it short. Mickelson carded a final round 68 to finish a shot back at 275 (−9). A 67 moved Lee Westwood into sole fourth, matching Davis Love III for low score of the final round.

Amateurs: Wilson (+12)
Source:

Scorecard
Final round

Cumulative tournament scores, relative to par
Source:

Playoff 
After 72 holes, Hamilton and Els were tied for the lead at 274 (−10), requiring a four-hole aggregate playoff, played over the 1st, 2nd, 17th, and 18th holes.  (The first use of this format in The Open was fifteen years earlier in 1989, also at Royal Troon.) Both players parred the first two holes, both par fours, and Hamilton managed a par 3 on the  17th. Els overshot the green and bogeyed, then parred the last, leaving Hamilton a 3-foot (1 m) par putt to win the Open, which he holed. Els had all four rounds in the 60s for the second time in an Open without winning; the other time was at Royal St. George's in 1993.

Scorecard 

Cumulative playoff scores, relative to par

References

External links 
Royal Troon 2004 (Official site)
133rd Open Championship - Royal Troon (European Tour)

The Open Championship
Golf tournaments in Scotland
Open Championship
Open Championship
Open Championship